Simon Rich (born June 5, 1984) is an American humorist, novelist, and screenwriter. He has published two novels and six collections of humor pieces, several of which appeared in The New Yorker. His novels and short stories have been translated into over a dozen languages. Rich was one of the youngest writers ever hired on Saturday Night Live, and served as a staff writer for Pixar. On January 14, 2015, Man Seeking Woman, a television comedy series created by Rich (and based upon his short story collection The Last Girlfriend on Earth) premiered on the cable channel FXX.

Early life and education
Rich was born and raised in New York City. He attended The Town School, and then went on to attend Dalton School. After graduating, he enrolled at Harvard University where he became president of the Harvard Lampoon. He was classmates with Facebook founder Mark Zuckerberg. His older brother is the novelist and essayist Nathaniel Rich, and his parents are Gail Winston and the essayist and columnist Frank Rich. His step-mother, Alex Witchel, is a reporter for The New York Times.

Career 
After graduating from Harvard, Rich wrote for Saturday Night Live for four years where the staff was nominated for the Emmy Award for Outstanding Writing in a Variety, Music or Comedy Series in 2008, 2009, and 2010 and won the Writers Guild of America Award for Comedy/Variety Series in 2009 and 2010. Rich then departed to work as a staff writer for Pixar. In 2013 and 2014, Rich was named to Forbes''' 30 Under 30 List.

 Magazine work 
Rich has written for McSweeney's, The Believer, GQ, The Observer magazine, Mad magazine, Vanity Fair, UK Glamour, Italian GQ, Italian Granta, NPR.com, NPR's "Selected Shorts," and the Barcelona Review, among other publications.

His writing has also been selected for numerous anthologies including The Best of McSweeney's, and I Found This Funny, edited by Judd Apatow. In 2013, Sony Pictures acquired the film rights to Rich's four-part novella Sell Out, which was originally published by the New Yorker that same year.

 Film work 
Rich wrote the screenplay for the film An American Pickle, which premiered in 2020. Seth Rogen starred in the dual lead roles and served as producer.

Upcoming projects
Rich is slated to write the script based on the illustrated book Unicorn Executions, to be produced by Universal Studios.

Writings

 Short stories 
As an undergraduate at Harvard University in 2007, Rich received a two-book contract from Random House. Rich's first book, a collection of short humor pieces entitled Ant Farm: And Other Desperate Situations was published in 2007 and was nominated for the Thurber Prize for American Humor. His second collection, Free Range Chickens, was published in 2008. Rich released his third collection of stories, The Last Girlfriend on Earth in 2013. Reception was favorable, with The Washington Post praising the book as "hilarious," declaring, "it just might be the best one-night stand you'll ever have."The Last Girlfriend on Earth was given a pilot order by FX within a week of its publishing as Man Seeking Woman. The show was officially ordered by FXX with the leading cast of Jay Baruchel, Eric Andre, Britt Lower and Maya Erskine, with Rich as show-runner and executive producer making him one of the youngest creators in TV history. The show was produced by Lorne Michaels' Broadway Video and ran on FXX for 3 seasons.

Rich's fourth story collection, Spoiled Brats, was published in 2014. The Guardian described it as "simply the funniest book of the year," adding "there are sometimes three laugh-out-loud moments within the same paragraph." The Evening Standard also praised the book, calling Rich "a Thurber, even a Wodehouse, for today. Who could ask for more? You can give his books to people and just watch them laugh."

A fifth collection, Hits and Misses, was published in July 2018. NPR said that "with this book, Rich has come into his own as one of the most talented writers of comedic fiction working today." In 2019, Rich won the Thurber Prize for American Humor for Hits and Misses.

Rich's sixth story collection, New Teeth, was published in July 2021.

 Novels 
Rich's third book and first novel, Elliot Allagash, was released in May 2010. In June that year, Jason Reitman optioned the movie rights to the novel. In 2012, Rich published his second novel, What in God's Name, which The New York Times Book Review compared to Douglas Adams' The Hitchhiker's Guide to the Galaxy. In 2019, the novel served as the basis for the first season of the TV series Miracle Workers. Subsequently, his short story Revolution inspired the second season of the program.

Personal life
Rich lives in Los Angeles with his wife, author Kathleen Hale, and has two daughters.

Filmography

Film

Television

 Bibliography 

 Novels 
 
 

 Short fiction 
Collections
 
 
 
 
 
 

 Essays, reporting and other contributions 
 
 
———————
Notes

References

External links

Work by Rich in The New Yorker''
Interview with and readings by Rich on The Sound of Young America public-radio program

1984 births
Living people
21st-century American Jews
21st-century American comedians
21st-century American male writers
21st-century American screenwriters
American male novelists
American male screenwriters
American male television writers
American people of German-Jewish descent
American people of Russian-Jewish descent
American television writers
Dalton School alumni
The Harvard Lampoon alumni
Jewish American male comedians
Jewish American novelists
Jewish American screenwriters
The New Yorker people
Novelists from New York (state)
Screenwriters from New York (state)